The Umayyad Palace is a large palatial complex from the Umayyad period, located on the Citadel Hill (Jabal al-Qal'a) of Amman, Jordan. Built during the first half of the 8th century, it is now largely ruined, with a restored domed entrance chamber, known as the "kiosk" or "monumental gateway".

See also
Desert castles, the common English name of a series of Umayyad fortified palaces and lodges (pl. qusur, sing. qasr) from the Southern Levant

External links
  Qantara Mediterranean Heritage, Umayyad Palace of Amman
  Andrew Petersen, Dictionary of Islamic Architecture, Jordan, Sassanian Influence ('Eastern'), p. 139

References

Buildings and structures in Amman
Archaeological sites in Jordan
Tourist attractions in Amman
Islamic architecture
8th-century establishments in the Umayyad Caliphate